is a railway station on the Rikuu East Line in the city of  Ōsaki, Miyagi Prefecture, Japan, operated by East Japan Railway Company (JR East).

Lines
Naruko-Gotenyu Station is served by the Rikuu East Line, and is located 42.7 rail kilometers from the terminus of the line at Kogota Station.

Station layout
Naruko-Gotenyu Station has one side platform, serving a single bi-directional track. The station is attended.

History
The station was absorbed into the JR East network upon the privatization of JNR on April 1, 1987. The station was renamed to its present name on 22 March 1997.

Passenger statistics
In fiscal 2016, the station was used by an average of 60 passengers daily (boarding passengers only).

Surrounding area
Japan National Route 47
 Higashi-Naruko Onsen

See also
 List of Railway Stations in Japan

References

External links

  

Railway stations in Miyagi Prefecture
Rikuu East Line
Railway stations in Japan opened in 1952
Ōsaki, Miyagi
Stations of East Japan Railway Company